Therese Tucker is an American businesswoman, the chairman, CEO and founder of BlackLine, an enterprise software company with a market cap of $2.17 billion as of 2018.

Early life
She has a bachelor's degree in Computer Science and Mathematics from the University of Illinois.

Career
Tucker's first job was with Hughes Aircraft as an engineer building fault detection firmware for surface ship sonar.

Tucker was the chief technology officer (CTO) at SunGard Treasury Systems.

In 2001, Tucker founded BlackLine, an enterprise software company. She took BlackLine public in 2016. Tucker served as chairman and CEO until she stepped down in August, 2020. She currently serves as Founder and Executive Chair on the company's Board of Directors.

Following the BlackLine IPO in October 2016, her net worth was estimated at $140 million, based on her shareholding of about 13% in a company valued at $1.15 billion. In February 2020, Forbes estimated her net worth at $370 million.

Award 
 2018: Forbes' America's Top 50 Women In Tech.

Personal life
Tucker is married, with two children, and her husband works as a hospital chaplain.

References

1960s births
Businesspeople from Los Angeles
Women corporate directors
American corporate directors
American women business executives
American women company founders
20th-century American businesspeople
21st-century American businesspeople
Living people
American company founders
University of Illinois alumni
American women chief executives
20th-century American businesswomen
21st-century American businesswomen